George McLean (born 16 September 1937) is a Scottish former  footballer.

References

1937 births
Living people
Scottish footballers
Association football forwards
Scottish Football League players
English Football League players
Cambuslang Rangers F.C. players
Rangers F.C. players
Norwich City F.C. players
Grimsby Town F.C. players
Exeter City F.C. players
Workington A.F.C. players
Barrow A.F.C. players
Boston United F.C. players